At the 1972 Summer Olympics, 20 wrestling events were contested, all for  men. There were 10 weight classes in Greco-Roman wrestling and 10 classes in freestyle wrestling.

Medal summary

Freestyle

Greco-Roman

Medal table

Participating nations
A total of 388 wrestlers from 49 nations competed at the Munich Games:

See also
List of World and Olympic Champions in men's freestyle wrestling
List of World and Olympic Champions in Greco-Roman wrestling

References

Sources
 

 
1972 Summer Olympics events
O
1972
1972